Mudassar Khan (born 20 October 1987) is an Indian dancer and film choreographer. He was a dance teacher in Thakur Public School Kandivali from 2001 to 2006. He is a judge in the dance reality television series Dance India Dance (season 4, season 5 & season 6).

Television 
Dance India Dance (season 4, season 5 & season 6) as a mentor and judge.
Dance India Dance Li'L champs season 3 as a judge

Choreographer 
Mudassar Khan has done choreography for films such as

References

External links

Living people
Indian choreographers
1987 births